The Handball events at the 1991 All-Africa Games were held in Cairo, Egypt on September 1991.

Qualified teams

Results

Following Namibia and Madagascar's withdrawal, the 6 remaining teams played in one unique round-robin tournament :

The results are:
 21 September 1991:  bt  17-16.
 23 September 1991:  bt  30-08.
 25 September 1991:  bt  19-18.
 27 September 1991:  bt  20-14.
 29 September 1991, 18h (salle omnisports, Cairo):  bt  16-12 (HT 7-5).
 date unknown:  bt  50-16.

Final ranking

References

 
1991 All-Africa Games
1991
African Games
Handball